Mohamed Saaif (born 17 March 1994) is a Maldivian professional footballer who plays as a defender for Green Streets.

Career
Saaif joined Valencia in 2012 and played at youth level before breaking through into the first team, under coach Ibrahim Asif. He also played for Maziya, before joining New Radiant in 2016. Saaif left New Radiant for Victory Sports Club in the mid-season and later joined Club Green Streets in the following year.

International
Saaif represented Maldives at the under 23 level before making his senior debut against Cambodia in the 2016 Bangabandhu Cup.

References

External links
 
 

1994 births
Living people
Maldivian footballers
Association football defenders
Maldives international footballers
Footballers at the 2014 Asian Games
Asian Games competitors for the Maldives